

The Mathisleweiher is a large bog lake, under 2 hectares in area, in the Black Forest in southern Germany. The pond impounds the Zartenbach which flows through it from west-southwest to east-northeast. A shorter stream runs from the north from the woods of the Stuckwald. It has a catchment of 1.0 km2

The lake is accessible from Hinterzarten but only on foot. A path runs from the village passing close to the lake and a spur branches off to the east shore.

Together with the Mathislehof, Mathislemühle and Mathislewald the pond belongs to the Müller-Fahnenberg Foundation of the University of Freiburg.

Origin of the name 
The Mathisleweiher s named after the nearby farm of Mathislehof, which in turn is named after the farmer, Mathias Rombach, who inherited the farm in 1736 by marrying the widow.

References

LUBW 
 Official online waterbody map with extract and layers used here: Karte von Mathisleweiher und Umgebung
 General access without presets and layers: 
Seefläche:
    
Dimensionen:
    
Höhe:
    
    
EZG:

Special references 
    Digital topographic map 1:10,000 series (DTK 10), Landesamt für Geoinformation und Landentwicklung Baden-Württemberg. URL: http://www.geoportal-bw.de/geoportal/opencms/de/geoviewer.html

External links 

 Map of the Mathisleweiher and surrounding area at: 
 Map of the Mathisleweiher and area with footpaths and cycleways at: 

Lakes of Baden-Württemberg
Breisgau-Hochschwarzwald
Baden
LMathisleweiher